Diamond Cut is an album by Tia Fuller, released in 2018.

Track listing
 "In the Trenches" - 6:18
 "Save Your Love for Me" - 5:40
 "I Love You" - 6:22
 "Queen Intuition" - 6:01
 "Joe'n Around" - 4:15
 "Crowns of Grey" - 5:55
 "The Coming" - 6:59
 "Soul Eyes" - 5:40
 "Delight" - 5:02
 "Fury of Da'mond" - 4:00
 "Tears of Santa Barbara" - 4:25
 "Joe'n Around (Alternate Take)" - 3:07

References

2018 albums
Jazz albums by American artists